Michael Somos is an American mathematician, who was a visiting scholar in the Georgetown University Mathematics and Statistics department for four years and is a visiting scholar at Catholic University of America. In the late eighties he proposed a conjecture about certain polynomial recurrences, now called Somos sequences, that surprisingly in some cases contain only integers. Somos' quadratic recurrence constant is also named after him.

Notes

References 
 Michael Somos and Robert Haas, "A Linked Pair of Sequences Implies the Primes Are Infinite", The American Mathematical Monthly, volume 110, number 6 (June – July, 2003), pp. 539–540

External links 
  Michael Somos's homepage
  Somos sequence in mathworld
The Troublemaker Number. Numberphile video on the Somos sequences

Living people
20th-century American mathematicians
21st-century American mathematicians
Combinatorialists
Year of birth missing (living people)